Ahmed Gul Khel is one of the numerous clans of the Sighaal division of Awan tribe. The small hamlet where the clan resides is known as Dhoke Ahmed Gul Khel which is a part of Kalri Village in Tehsil and District Mianwali of Punjab, Pakistan.

Punjabi tribes